Homme may refer to:

People
 , the French language word for "man" or "human"
 Homme (surname), a list of people with the surname Homme

Places
 Homme, Agder, a village in the municipality of Valle in Agder county, Norway
 Homme dam, a dam which created Homme lake near Park River, North Dakota, USA

Other
 Bête, a historical French card game originally known as jeu de l'homme, l'homme or homme
 Homme (band), a South Korean band
 Homme by David Beckham, a men's eau de toilette fragrance endorsed by English footballer David Beckham